The All or Nothing World Tour was the second Asia tour and third concert tour overall by South Korean girl group 2NE1, in support of their second Korean studio album Crush (2014). The tour visited various countries in Asia including South Korea, Japan, Philippines, China, Thailand, Malaysia and more from March to October 2014. It was 2NE1's final concert tour before their disbandment two years later in 2016.

Background
In December 2013, YG Entertainment announced that 2NE1 would embark on their second world tour in March of the following year, which would visit 17 cities in 9 countries. The All or Nothing World Tour was officially revealed on January 15, 2014, alongside the reveal of 2NE1's second Korean-language studio album Crush. The tour kicked off at the SK Olympic Handball Gymnasium in Seoul on March 1 and March 2, 2014, prior to the group's music program promotions for the album and concluded on October 17 in Macau at the Cotai Arena.

The concerts in Taipei generated about NT$22.1 million (US$730,000).

Concert synopsis
The concerts for All or Nothing were divided into four parts—each with a different theme color. The first theme, pink,  featured the group members utilizing laser gun props. After "Don't Stop the Music", the pace slowed down for the second theme: innocence, themed in white. The members took a break from dancing, and sat down at the front of the stage to perform acoustic renditions of their songs "Missing You", "If I Were You", and "Come Back Home".

The third section represented love and featured the utilization of red lights as they performed a lap dance version of "I Love You", followed by a second rendition of "Come Back Home" among other tracks. CL kicked off the fourth section, rebellion—in black—with her solo singles, with Bom, Dara and Minzy joining her afterwards for the Korean version of "Scream". The performance of "I Am the Best" featured the group members sitting astride motorbikes. It was followed by rock renditions of "I Don't Care" and "Go Away", and an encore with the members in banana-print pajamas.

Set list
Main set
 "Crush"
 "Fire"
 "Clap Your Hands"
 "Pretty Boy"
 "Don't Stop the Music"
 "Missing You"
 "If I Were You"
 "Come Back Home" (Unplugged Version)
 "Ugly"
 "I Love You"
 "Come Back Home"
 "Gotta Be You"
 "Do You Love Me"
 "The Baddest Female" / "MTBD" (CL solo)
 "Scream"
 "I Am the Best" (Motorcycle Version)
 "I Don't Care" (Rock Version)
 "Go Away" (Rock Version)

Encore

Seoul:
 "Lonely"
 "I Am the Best" (Remix)
 "Can't Nobody"

Manila:
 "Lonely"
 "In or Out"
 "Gotta Be You"
 "Can't Nobody"

Tour dates

Broadcast and recordings

2014 2NE1 World Tour: All or Nothing (Live in Seoul)

2014 2NE1 World Tour: All or Nothing (Live in Seoul) is the fourth live album of South Korean girl group 2NE1. The live album was released on May 23, 2014, by YG Entertainment. The album was recorded during the group's first concert during their Seoul dates on March 1 and 2, 2014, at the SK Olympic Handball Gymnasium. 

A Japanese version of the live album was released on December 10, 2014, which was recorded during the group's Yokohama concert on July 6.

Track listing

Notes

References

See also
 Power World Tour

External links
 2NE1 official site

2014 concert tours
2NE1
Concert tours of Asia
Concert tours of Japan